Joel Guillon is a paralympic shooter from France. He has competed in three consecutive games where he won a gold medal in 1980 and silver in 1984. In his third games in 1988 he finished in eighth place.

References

External links 
 

Paralympic shooters of France
Shooters at the 1980 Summer Paralympics
Shooters at the 1984 Summer Paralympics
Shooters at the 1988 Summer Paralympics
Paralympic gold medalists for France
Paralympic silver medalists for France
Living people
Year of birth missing (living people)
Medalists at the 1980 Summer Paralympics
Medalists at the 1984 Summer Paralympics
Paralympic medalists in shooting
20th-century French people